Montenegrin women's volleyball clubs were participating in the CEV competitions since the season 1998-99.

First team which ever competed at the European cups was ŽOK Luka Bar. Except them, in CEV competitions played also ŽOK Galeb.

Montenegrin women's volleyball teams played in Women's CEV Cup and CEV Women's Challenge Cup, and from the season 2016-17 in the qualifiers for CEV Women's Champions League.

List of matches
Below is a list of games of all Montenegrin clubs in CEV competitions.

Performances by clubs
During the overall history, two different Montenegrin clubs played in CEV competitions.

As of the end of CEV competitions 2019–20 season.

Opponents by countries
Below is the list of performances of Montenegrin clubs against opponents in CEV competitions by their countries (volleyball federations).

As of the end of CEV competitions 2019–20 season.

See also
 Montenegrin women's volley league
 Montenegrin women's volleyball Cup
 Montenegro women's national volleyball team
 Volleyball Federation of Montenegro (OSCG)

References

External links
 Volleyball Federation of Montenegro

Volleyball in Montenegro
Women's sports leagues in Montenegro